Belene Cove  is the 520 m wide cove indenting for 690 m the northwest coast of Ray Promontory, part of Svishtov Cove in Byers Peninsula, Livingston Island in the South Shetland Islands, Antarctica.  The cove is entered between Isbul Point and Start Point.

The feature is named after the town of Belene in northern Bulgaria.

Location
British mapping in 1968, Spanish in 1993 and Bulgarian in 2009.

Maps
 L.L. Ivanov. Antarctica: Livingston Island and Greenwich, Robert, Snow and Smith Islands. Scale 1:120000 topographic map.  Troyan: Manfred Wörner Foundation, 2009.

References
 Belene Cove. SCAR Composite Gazetteer of Antarctica.
 Bulgarian Antarctic Gazetteer. Antarctic Place-names Commission. (details in Bulgarian, basic data in English)

External links
 Belene Cove. Copernix satellite image

Coves of Livingston Island
Bulgaria and the Antarctic